The Cruzen Range is a mountain range that rises to 1600 m in Vashka Crag and extends west to east for  between Salyer Ledge and Nickell Peak in the McMurdo Dry Valleys, Victoria Land. The range is bounded to north, east, south and west by the Clare Range, Victoria Valley, Barwick Valley, and the Webb Glacier. Named by the Advisory Committee on Antarctic Names in 2005 after Rear Admiral Richard H. Cruzen, commander of Task Force 68 during the U.S. Navy Antarctic Developments Project, 1946-47 (Operation Highjump).

Alexander Valley
The lower end of the valley is ice free and opens to Victoria Upper Glacier; the upper portion is partly ice covered and is surmounted by Mount Isaac, . It was named by the Advisory Committee on Antarctic Names in 2005 after Stephen Paul Alexander, a United States Antarctic Program marine biologist studying McMurdo Sound benthic foraminifera for six seasons between 1985 and 2001; laboratory manager, Crary Science and Engineering Center, McMurdo Station for three seasons (2002-2004).

Kreutz Snowfield
The Kreutz Snowfield is an intermontane snowfield of 3 square miles in the McMurdo Dry Valleys. The snowfield is bounded to the south by Forsyth Peak, to the west by the Victoria Upper Névé, to the north by Mount Leland, and to the east by Mount Isaac. It was named by the Advisory Committee on Antarctic Names in 2005 after Karl J. Kreutz, Department of Geological Sciences, University of Maine, who investigated late Holocene climate variability from Siple Dome ice cores for three field seasons from 1994 to 1997; from Taylor Glacier and Clark Glacier ice cores for two seasons, 2003 to 2005.

Mount Isaac
It was named by the New Zealand Geographic Board in 2005 after Michael James Isaac ('Mike' b: 31/5/51, d: 13/7/17), a New Zealand geologist who led a scientific party during two visits in 1985 and 1992. He also returned to Antarctica in 2005.

Mount Novak
It was named by the Advisory Committee on Antarctic Names in 2005 after Giles Novak, Department of Physics and Astronomy, Northwestern University in Evanston, Illinois; a member of the United States Antarctic Program astrophysics team at Amundsen–Scott South Pole Station for 11 summer seasons between 1992 and 2004.

References

Mountain ranges of Victoria Land